The Reprise License Manager (RLM) is the software licensing toolkit developed and marketed by Reprise Software, providing on-premises and cloud-based license management, license enforcement and product activation solutions for publishers of commercial software applications. The Reprise License Manager is used by over 800 Independent Software Vendors: 
 Computer Modelling Group
 The Foundry Visionmongers
 Hewlett-Packard
 Intergraph
 SAP SE 
 Siemens
 Tecplot
 Trimble Navigation
 ViaSat
 Live2D Cubism

See also
 Copy protection
 Digital rights management
 Floating licensing
 License borrowing
 List of license managers
 Product activation

References
(2009) 22 Embedded Systems Design 2 Google Books.
Chemical Engineering Process. 2008. Volume 104. Issues 7-12. Page 34. Google Books.

External links

 RLM License Administration Manual

System administration
Software licenses